John Enns (born January 30, 1967) is an American politician who served in the Oklahoma House of Representatives from the 41st district from 2006 to 2018.

References

1967 births
Living people
Republican Party members of the Oklahoma House of Representatives